Willful blindness is a term used in law to describe a situation in which a person seeks to avoid civil or criminal liability for a wrongful act by intentionally keeping themselves unaware of facts that would render them liable or implicated. In United States v. Jewell, the court held that proof of willful ignorance satisfied the requirement of knowledge as to criminal possession and importation of drugs.

Although the term was originally—and still is—used in legal contexts, the phrase "willful ignorance" has come to mean any situation in which people intentionally turn their attention away from an ethical problem that is believed to be important by those using the phrase (for instance, because the problem is too disturbing for people to want it dominating their thoughts, or from the knowledge that solving the problem would require extensive effort).

Terminology
Willful blindness or Wilful blindness is sometimes called ignorance of law, willful ignorance, contrived ignorance, Conscious avoidance, intentional ignorance or Nelsonian knowledge.

The jury instruction for willful blindess is sometimes called the "ostrich instruction."

Precedent in the United States 
In United States v. Jewell, the court held that proof of willful ignorance satisfied the requirement of knowledge as to criminal possession and importation of drugs. In a number of cases in the United States of America, persons transporting packages containing illegal drugs have asserted that they never asked what the contents of the packages were and so lacked the requisite intent to break the law. Such defenses have not succeeded, as courts have been quick to determine that the defendant should have known what was in the package and exercised criminal recklessness by failing to find out the package's contents.  Notably, this rule has only ever been applied to independent couriers, and has never been used to hold larger services that qualify as common carriers (e.g., FedEx, United Parcel Service, or the U.S. Postal Service) liable for the contents of packages they deliver.

A famous example of such a defense being denied occurred in In re Aimster Copyright Litigation, in which the defendants argued that the file-swapping technology was designed in such a way that they had no way of monitoring the content of swapped files. They suggested that their inability to monitor the activities of users meant that they could not be contributing to copyright infringement by the users. The court held that this was willful blindness on the defendant’s part and would not constitute a defense to a claim of contributory infringement.

See also 
 Recklessness (law)
 Vincible ignorance
 Willful Blindness (book)
 Willful violation
 Plausible deniability
 Turning a blind eye

References 

 Luban, David. Contrived Ignorance (1999), Vol. 87 Georgetown Law Journal, 957.

External links 
 Willful blindness per the IRS IRM Manual

Criminal law
Ignorance